Adrian Prenkaj is a public policy consultant, former Kosovo diplomat and former Adviser for European Integration to the President of the Republic of Kosovo, Atifete Jahjaga, He joined Jahjaga's Cabinet in February 2012, following three years as First Secretary for Political Affairs at the Embassy of the Republic of Kosovo in the United States. Before joining the diplomatic service of Kosovo, he worked as a Senior European Affairs Officer in the Agency for European Integration of Kosovo.

Education
He holds a Bachelor of Arts degree in political science from the Universiteti i Prishtinës. In 2008, he completed a master's degree in international relations (Europe) at the School of Government and International Affairs, Durham University, in the United Kingdom, with focus on EU policy process, US Foreign Policy and German foreign policy.

President's Cabinet
Adrian Prenkaj served as President’s representative in the Kosovo’s Negotiating Team for the Stabilization and Association Agreement with the European Union. He was also involved in coordination and implementation of the EU Visa Liberalization Roadmap for Kosovo. He has worked throughout his tenure advising on a range of domestic and foreign policy issues, with legislation and policy processes in line with EU accession process.

He coordinated the work of the National Council for European Integration, an institutional mechanism established and led by President Jahjaga.

Millennium Challenge Corporation - MCC - Kosovo
Adrian Prenkaj led successfully national efforts to qualify Kosovo for the US Government's Millennium Challenge Corporation (MCC) development funds. In January 2015, he was appointed by President Jahjaga to coordinate national institutions and UN agencies in Kosovo to improve policy performance on a number of development and rule of law indicators. Due to these efforts, Kosovo passed MCC’s scorecard for the first time since 2008,  with 13 out of 20 indicators. At its quarterly meeting on 16 December 2015, the Millennium Challenge Corporation Board of Directors voted to make Kosovo for the first time eligible for a compact program, MCC’s large-scale investment program.

External links
Facebook Page
Twitter

References

Kosovan diplomats
Living people
People from Prizren
1978 births
Alumni of Durham University